WLLK-FM (102.3 MHz) is a radio station licensed to Somerset, Kentucky, United States.  The station is currently owned by iHeartMedia, Inc.

History
The station went on the air as WLLK on June 13, 1988, owned by Walt Williams. In summer 1999, Williams sold the station to First Radio, owners of  WKEQ (910 AM; now WSEK) WSFC (1230 AM), WSEK (96.7 FM; now WJQQ), and WWZB (93.9 FM; now WSEK-FM).

On April 10, 2001, the station changed its call sign to WKII-FM; it changed to WHMJ-FM on March 15, 2004, and to WLLK-FM on August 18, 2005.

References

External links

LLK-FM
IHeartMedia radio stations
Contemporary hit radio stations in the United States
Somerset, Kentucky
1988 establishments in Kentucky
Radio stations established in 1988